Michael Craig (born June 6, 1971) is a Canadian former professional hockey forward who played in the National Hockey League. He was the last former Minnesota North Star active in professional hockey, and was an assistant coach with the Lethbridge Hurricanes of the Western Hockey League.

Playing career
Craig was born in London, but he grew up in nearby Thorndale, Ontario.

Craig had a strong career in the OHL where he played for the Oshawa Generals for three seasons alongside Eric Lindros. After an unspectacular rookie season, he posted excellent numbers, scoring 72 points in 63 games in the 1988/1989 season. His best Junior season was in 1989/1990 when he scored 76 points in 43 and won the Memorial Cup with the Generals. He would also win back to back gold medals playing for Team Canada at the World Junior Ice Hockey Championships in 1990 and 1991 and was named a first team all-star in 1991.

He was drafted 28th overall in the second round of the 1989 NHL Entry Draft by the Minnesota North Stars.

His NHL career would prove to be less than spectacular, scoring 71 goals and 168 points in 423 games over 9 seasons. He would play with the North Stars and was a part of the team when they moved to Dallas. He also played with Toronto Maple Leafs and San Jose Sharks while also spending time with several IHL and AHL teams.

In 2002, Craig was part of the Canadian team that won the Spengler Cup over host team HC Davos. Craig would score the game-winning goal in the final game of round robin play.

While playing with the Vienna Capitals in the Austrian Hockey League, he led the league in scoring in 2004–05 and leading the Capitals to the championship.

In 2007–08 he joined EC KAC also in the Austrian Hockey League. On October 18, 2011, he signed EC VSV, also in Austria.

During the midpoint of the 2013 season, Craig signed as a free agent for his last professional season in Italy with league leaders HC Neumarkt-Egna of the second division on January 13, 2013.

Awards
1990 Won Memorial Cup with Oshawa Generals
1990 Won World Junior Championships Gold Medal
1991 Won World Junior Championships Gold Medal
1991 World Junior Championships First Team All-Star
2002 Won Spengler Cup with Team Canada

Career statistics

Regular season and playoffs

International

References

External links

1971 births
Living people
Calgary Flames scouts
Canadian ice hockey right wingers
Dallas Stars players
EC VSV players
Ice hockey people from Ontario
EC KAC players
Kansas City Blades players
Minnesota North Stars draft picks
Minnesota North Stars players
Oshawa Generals players
People from Middlesex County, Ontario
San Antonio Dragons players
San Jose Sharks players
SCL Tigers players
Sportspeople from London, Ontario
Toronto Maple Leafs players
Vienna Capitals players
Canadian expatriate ice hockey players in Austria
Canadian expatriate ice hockey players in Switzerland